The 11th Annual Tony Awards took place at the Waldorf-Astoria Grand Ballroom on April 21, 1957. The Master of Ceremonies was Bud Collyer.

Ceremony
The presenters were Faye Emerson, Tom Ewell, Lillian Gish, Helen Hayes, Nancy Kelly, Bert Lahr, Beatrice Lillie, Nancy Olson, Elaine Perry, Cliff Robertson, and Cornelia Otis Skinner.

Performers were George Gaines and Michael King. Music was by Meyer Davis and his Orchestra. Due to a union dispute, there was no television broadcast, which had been scheduled for WCBS-TV Channel 2.

Winners and nominees
Winners are in bold

{| class=wikitable width="95%"
|-
! style="background:#C0C0C0;" ! width="50%" | Best Play
! style="background:#C0C0C0;" ! width="50%" | Best Musical
|-
| valign="top" |
 Long Day's Journey into Night – Eugene O'Neill The Potting Shed – Graham Greene
 Separate Tables – Terence Rattigan
 The Waltz of the Toreadors – Jean Anouilh with English version by Lucienne Hill
| valign="top" |
 My Fair Lady
 Bells Are Ringing
 Candide
 The Most Happy Fella
|-
! style="background:#C0C0C0;" ! style="width="50%" | Best Performance by a Leading Actor in a Play
! style="background:#C0C0C0;" ! style="width="50%" | Best Performance by a Leading Actress in a Play
|-
| valign="top" |
Fredric March – Long Day's Journey into Night as James Tyrone
 Maurice Evans – The Apple Cart as King Magnus
 Wilfrid Hyde-White – The Reluctant Debutante as Jimmy Broadbent
 Eric Portman – Separate Tables as Mr. Malcolm / Major Pollock
 Ralph Richardson – The Waltz of the Toreadors as General St. Pé
 Cyril Ritchard – Visit to a Small Planet as Kreton
| valign="top" |
Margaret Leighton – Separate Tables as Mrs. Shankland / Miss Railton-Bell
 Florence Eldridge – Long Day's Journey into Night as Mary Cavan Tyrone
 Rosalind Russell – Auntie Mame as Auntie Mame
 Sybil Thorndike – The Potting Shed as Mrs. Callifer
|-
! style="background:#C0C0C0;" ! style="width="50%" | Best Performance by a Leading Actor in a Musical
! style="background:#C0C0C0;" ! style="width="50%" | Best Performance by a Leading Actress in a Musical
|-
| valign="top" |
Rex Harrison – My Fair Lady as Henry Higgins
 Fernando Lamas – Happy Hunting as Duke of Granada
 Robert Weede – The Most Happy Fella as Tony
| valign="top" |
 Judy Holliday – Bells Are Ringing as Ella Peterson
 Julie Andrews – My Fair Lady as Eliza Doolittle
 Ethel Merman – Happy Hunting as Liz Livingstone
|-
! style="background:#C0C0C0;" ! style="width="50%" | Best Performance by a Featured Actor in a Play
! style="background:#C0C0C0;" ! style="width="50%" | Best Performance by a Featured Actress in a Play
|-
| valign="top" |
Frank Conroy – The Potting Shed as Father William Callifer
 Eddie Mayehoff – Visit to a Small Planet as General Tom Powers
 William Podmore – Separate Tables as Mr. Fowler
 Jason Robards – Long Day's Journey into Night as James Tyrone, Jr.
| valign="top" |
Peggy Cass – Auntie Mame as Agnes Gooch
 Anna Massey – The Reluctant Debutante as Jane Broadbent
 Beryl Measor – Separate Tables as Miss Cooper
 Mildred Natwick – The Waltz of the Toreadors as Mme. St. Pé
 Phyllis Neilson-Terry – Separate Tables as Mrs. Railton-Bell
 Diana Van der Vlis – The Happiest Millionaire as Cordelia Biddle
|-
! style="background:#C0C0C0;" ! style="width="50%" | Best Performance by a Featured Actor in a Musical
! style="background:#C0C0C0;" ! style="width="50%" | Best Performance by a Featured Actress in a Musical
|-
| valign="top" |
Sydney Chaplin – Bells Are Ringing as Jeff Moss
 Robert Coote – My Fair Lady as Colonel Pickering
 Stanley Holloway – My Fair Lady as Alfred P. Doolittle
| valign="top" |
Edie Adams – Li'l Abner as Daisy Mae
 Virginia Gibson – Happy Hunting as Beth Livingstone
 Irra Petina – Candide as The Old Lady / Madame Sofronia
 Jo Sullivan – The Most Happy Fella as Rosabella
|-
! style="background:#C0C0C0;" ! style="width="50%" | Best Director
! style="background:#C0C0C0;" ! style="width="50%" | Best Choreography
|-
| valign="top" |
Moss Hart – My Fair Lady
 Joseph Anthony – A Clearing in the Woods / The Most Happy Fella
 Harold Clurman – The Waltz of the Toreadors
 Peter Glenville – Separate Tables
 José Quintero – Long Day's Journey into Night
| valign="top" |
Michael Kidd – Li'l Abner
 Hanya Holm – My Fair Lady
 Dania Krupska – The Most Happy Fella
 Bob Fosse & Jerome Robbins – Bells Are Ringing
|-
! style="background:#C0C0C0;" ! style="width="50%" | Best Scenic Design
! style="background:#C0C0C0;" ! style="width="50%" | Best Costume Design
|-
| valign="top" |
Oliver Smith – My Fair Lady
 Boris Aronson – A Hole in the Head / Small War on Murray Hill
 Ben Edwards – The Waltz of the Toreadors
 George Jenkins - The Happiest Millionaire / Too Late the Phalarope
 Donald Oenslager – Major Barbara
 Oliver Smith – Auntie Mame / A Clearing in the Woods / Candide / Eugenia / My Fair Lady / Visit to a Small Planet
| valign="top" |
Cecil Beaton – My Fair Lady
 Cecil Beaton – Little Glass Clock / My Fair Lady
 Alvin Colt – Li'l Abner / The Sleeping Prince
 Dorothy Jeakins – Major Barbara / Too Late the Phalarope
 Irene Sharaff – Candide / Happy Hunting / Shangri-La / Small War on Murray Hill
|-
! style="background:#C0C0C0;" ! style="width="50%" | Best Conductor and Musical Director
! style="background:#C0C0C0;" ! style="width="50%" | Best Stage Technician
|-
| valign="top" |
 Franz Allers – My Fair Lady
 Herbert Greene – The Most Happy Fella
 Samuel Krachmalnick – Candide
| valign="top" |
 Howard McDonald (posthumous), carpenter – Major Barbara
 Thomas Fitzgerald, sound man – Long Day's Journey into Night
 Joseph Harbuck, carpenter - Auntie Mame
|}

Multiple nominations and awards

These productions had multiple nominations:10 nominations: My Fair Lady  6 nominations: Long Day's Journey into Night, The Most Happy Fella and Separate Tables  5 nominations: Candide and The Waltz of the Toreadors 4 nominations: Auntie Mame, Bells Are Ringing and Happy Hunting 3 nominations: Li'l Abner, Major Barbara, The Potting Shed and A Visit to a Small Planet 2 nominations: A Clearing in the Woods, The Happiest Millionaire, The Reluctant Debutante, Small War on Murray Hill and Too Late the PhalaropeThe following productions received multiple awards.6 wins: My Fair Lady  2 wins: Bells Are Ringing, Li'l Abner and Long Day's Journey into Night''

References

External links
The American Theatre Wing Tony Awards

Tony Awards ceremonies
1957 in theatre
1957 awards
1957 in the United States
1957 in New York City
1957 awards in the United States
April 1957 events in the United States